Arthur Willner (5 March 18816 April 1959) was a Czech composer and teacher.

Willner was born in Turn in Teplitz-Schönau, Bohemia, Austrian Empire. Having trained in Leipzig with Karl Piutti and Carl Reinecke and Munich with Ludwig Thuille and Joseph Rheinberger, he secured his first significant academic post at the young age of twenty-three, when he was appointed deputy director of the Stern'sches Konservatorium, Berlin. He worked there from 1902 until 1924, teaching courses in composition, score reading, orchestration, harmony, counterpoint, canon and fugue. Then, was invited by former students to start a music conservatory in Istanbul. However, the extreme change of politics and government instability forced him to leave after 8 months. He moved to Vienna in 1923, where he taught at the Volkshochschule and Wiener Neues Konservatorium, and edited music for Universal Edition until his emigration.

On 15 March 1938, Willner left Austria for Paris to escape the German Anschluss of Austria; he moved to England later that year. After arriving in England, Willner received an invitation through the Jewish Centre, Woburn House from Arthur Franklin, director of Routledge & Co, to stay at Chartridge House, Buckinghamshire. Willner stayed for two months, during which time he composed the English Concerto for Chamber Orchestra (Op. 98). This work is one of only three English-themed works in his entire known output (the others being the Hereford Suite (Op. 102) and a handful of English songs).

In September 1939, Willner and his wife moved to Kington, Herefordshire, to stay at the gardener's cottage at Gravel Hill, residence of English composer E. J. Moeran's family. Willner earned his living partly as a teacher of composition - one of his pupils was the Australian composer Anne Macky. In 1945, Willner's wife, Cecile, became fatally ill and, after a short period in Edgbaston Hospital in Birmingham, she was moved to a nursing home in London. Cecile died later that year. Willner developed a heart condition in 1948, which left him bed-bound, until his own death at 68 Upshoot Hill, Cricklewood in 1959.

Willner composed over well over 100 works. Despite his relatively prominent place in the German musical establishment during the first part of the century, most of his works are now completely unknown and many believed lost. They included orchestral music (including six symphonies, a violin concerto op 67, two piano concertos and a concerto for string orchestra, op 37), chamber music (much of it with piano, but also five string quartets), choral music and song. Universal published a few of his works in Austria and Novello and Hinrichsin (now Peters) in London. His "highly chromatic and intense" Sonata for Solo Flute, op 34 is currently the only piece of his still in print and recorded. Otherwise he is best remembered for arrangements, such as his string orchestra transcription of Béla Bartók's Romanian Folk Dances for piano, and for his orchestral reduction of Richard Strauss's Concerto for Oboe.

References

External links 
 
 Guide to the Arthur Willner Collection at the Leo Baeck Institute, New York.
 List of émigré musicians from Nazi Europe who settled in Britain

Jewish classical composers
Czech classical composers
Czech male classical composers
Czech Jews
Czech expatriates in Germany
Czech expatriates in Austria
Jewish emigrants from Austria to the United Kingdom after the Anschluss
People from Teplice
1881 births
1959 deaths
20th-century Czech male musicians